Acalolepta romblonica is a species of beetle in the family Cerambycidae. It was described by Karl-Ernst Hüdepohl in 1992. It is known from the Philippines.

References

Acalolepta
Beetles described in 1992